The National Centre for Polar and Ocean Research, (NCPOR) formerly known as the National Centre for Antarctic and Ocean Research (NCAOR) is an Indian research and development institution, situated in Vasco da Gama, Goa. It is an autonomous Institution of the Department of Ocean Development (DOD), Ministry of Earth Sciences, Government of India which is responsible for administering the Indian Antarctic Programme and maintains the Indian government's Antarctic research stations, Bharati and Maitri. NCPOR was established as NCAOR on 25 May 1998, with Dr. Prem Chand Pandey NCPOR is known for its participation in global experiments, hosting of international conferences and in the leadership of international committees concerned with Antarctic science. At present the chairman of NCPOR is Dr. M. Ravichandran who is also secretary Ministry of Earth Sciences. The present director of NCPOR is  Mr. Mirza Javed Beg
At present, NCPOR is an agency working under the Ministry of Earth Sciences, Government of India since 2006, by the notification of the president of India.

NCPOR complex is a home to a special low-temperature laboratory and is setting up a National Antarctic Data Centre and a Polar Museum.

The NCPOR operates in different fields or tasks:

 storing ice core samples, from Antarctica and the Himalayas. 
 operating the Himadri and IndARC Arctic research stations in Svalbard, Norway.
 managing the oceanic research vessel ORV Sagar Kanya, the flagship of India's fleet of oceanographic study vessels. This ship has contributed significantly to India's study of the Arabian Sea, the Bay of Bengal, and the Indian Ocean.
 it supported the KBCAOS, University of Allahabad from initial stage of establishment up to the final stage of the center as full-fledged faculty centre, in form of a project as per collaborative work with the university.

This centre was previously referred to as the Antarctic Study Centre. It came into existence with joining of Dr. P. C. Pandey as the director on 12 May 1997.

On 9 October 2016, the National Centre for Antarctic and Ocean Research (NCAOR) established a high altitude research station in Himalaya called Himansh. The station is situated above 13500 feet (> 4000 m) at a remote region in Spiti, Himachal Pradesh.

References

External links
Official website
Research Vessel Movement

Research institutes in India
Indian Antarctic Programme
Indian Arctic Programme
Research institutes established in 1998
1998 establishments in Goa
Earth science research institutes
Organisations based in Goa
Buildings and structures in Vasco da Gama, Goa
Ministry of Earth Sciences
Antarctic research
Education in South Goa district